MV Nuliajuk, named for the Netsilik Inuit goddess Nuliajuk, is a multi-purpose research vessel owned and operated by the government of Nunavut in northern Canada.

References

Boats
Transport in Nunavut
Research vessels of Canada
Research vessels